Cook County Airport  is a county-owned, public-use airport in Cook County, Georgia, United States. It is located one nautical mile (2 km) west of the central business district of Adel, Georgia. This airport is included in the National Plan of Integrated Airport Systems for 2011–2015, which categorized it as a general aviation airport.

Facilities and aircraft 
Cook County Airport covers an area of 368 acres (149 ha) at an elevation of 236 feet (72 m) above mean sea level. It has two asphalt paved runways: 5/23 is 5,001 by 100 feet (1,524 x 30 m) and 15/33 is 4,000 by 100 feet (1,219 x 30 m).

For the 12-month period ending June 17, 2011, the airport had 10,200 general aviation aircraft operations, an average of 27 per day. At that time there were 13 aircraft based at this airport: 92% single-engine and 8% ultralight.

References

External links 
 15J - Cook County (Adel) at Georgia DOT airport directory
 Elite Aircraft Services, the fixed-base operator (FBO)
 Aerial image as of March 1999 from USGS The National Map
 
 

Airports in Georgia (U.S. state)
Buildings and structures in Cook County, Georgia
Transportation in Cook County, Georgia